Robert Hall, the elder (1728–1791) was an English Particular Baptist minister, known as an proponent of Fullerism and an opponent of so-called hyper-Calvinism.

Life
Hall was a pastor at Arnesby in Leicestershire. His ministry extended into parts of Warwickshire.

Works
Help to Zion's Travellers (1781) analysed doctrinal difficulties facing Baptists of the older hyper-Calvinist school in accepting his views. Influential in that school were the teachings of Tobias Crisp, Richard Davis, and Joseph Hussey, through John Brine and John Gill.

Family
Hall married Jane Catchaside, and they had a family of 14 children. The youngest of those, Robert Hall, the younger, was also a Baptist minister, and became better known than his father.

Notes

1728 births
1791 deaths
English Baptists
People from Arnesby